This list covers television programs whose first letter (excluding "the") of the title is C.

C

CA

C.A.B.
Cade's County
Cadillacs and Dinosaurs
Caesar's Hour
Cagney & Lacey
Caillou
Caitlin's Way
Cake
Cake Boss
Cake Wars
California Dreams
California Fever
Californication
Calimero
Call Me Kat
Call Red
Call the Midwife (BBC)
Callan
Calucci's Department
Camberwick Green (British)
Camelot
Camouflage
Camp
Camp Candy
Camp Lakebottom
Camp Lazlo
Camp Runamuck
Camp WWE
Campion (BBC)
Canada's Next Top Model
Canadian Idol
Candice Tells All (Canada)
Candid Camera
Candidly Nicole
Candle in the Tomb (China)
The Candy Apple News Company
Canimals
Cannon
Cannonball
Naeil's Cantabile (South Korea)
Canterbury's Law
Can You Duet
The Cape (1996)
The Cape (2011)
Caprica
Captain Caveman and the Teen Angels
Captain Flamingo
Captain Kangaroo
Captain N: The Game Master
Captain Nice
Captain Planet and the Planeteers
Captain Power
Captain Scarlet and the Mysterons
Captain Video and His Video Rangers
Car 54, Where Are You?
Cara Sucia (Venezuela)
The Cara Williams Show
The Carbonaro Effect
Card Captors
Card Sharks
Care Bears
Care Bears: Adventures in Care-a-lot
Care Bears & Cousins
The Care Bears Family
Caribe (United States)
Caribe (Venezuela)
Carl²
Carmen Sandiego (2019)
The Carmichael Show
Carnival Eats
Carnivàle
The Carol Burnett Show
The Carol Duvall Show
Caroline in the City
Caroline & Friends
The Caroline Rhea Show
Carpool Karaoke: The Series 
The Carrie Diaries
Cartoon Planet
Carson Nation
The Casagrandes
Casey Jones (American Western)
Cash Cab (British original)
Cash Cab (Australia)
Cash Cab (Canada)
Cash Cab (Japan)
Cash Cab (US)
Casper's Scare School
Casper and Friends
The Castaways (Australia)
Castaways (US)
Castle
Castle Rock
Castlevania
Casualty (British)
The Cat in the Hat Knows a Lot About That!
Catalyst
The Catch
Catch 21
Catchphrase
CatDog
Catfish: The TV Show
The Catherine Tate Show
Catherine the Great
Catscratch
Catwalk (Australia)
Cave Kids
Cavemen

CB

CBS Evening News
CBS Morning News
CBS News Sunday Morning
CBS Overnight News
CBS Storybreak
CBS This Morning

CE

Cedar Cove
The Celebrity Apprentice
Celebrity Big Brother (UK)
Celebrity Big Brother (US)
Celebrity Blackjack
Celebrity Charades
Celebrity Deathmatch
Celebrity Family Feud
Celebrity Name Game
Celebrity Page
Celebrity Rehab Presents Sober House
Celebrity Rehab with Dr. Drew
Celebrity Undercover Boss
Celebrity Watch Party
Celebs Go Dating (UK)
Centaurworld
Centennial
Central Park
Central Park West
C. Everett Koop, M.D.

CH

Chain Reaction
Chalk
ChalkZone
The Challenge
The Challenge: Champs vs. Stars
Champion the Wonder Horse
Champions
The Champions (Canada)
The Champions (UK)
Championship Wrestling from Hollywood
The Changes (UK) 
Channel Zero
 Chaotic
Chappelle's Show
Charles in Charge
Charlie Chalk
Charlie Jade
Charlie Rose
Charlie's Angels (1976)
Charlie's Angels (2011)
Charlie Brown
The Charlie Brown & Snoopy Show
Charlie and Lola (UK)
Charmed (1998)
Charmed (2018)
The Charmings
Charm School
Chase (1973)
Chase (2010)
The Chase (2006 drama)
The Chase (UK game show)
The Chase (US game show)
The Chase Australia 
Cha$e
Chasing Life
Chasing Maria Menounos
Cheaters
Cheating Craft (2016) (Japan)
Checking In
Cheech & Chong: Roasted
Cheerleader Nation
Cheer Perfection
Cheers
Cheez TV
Chefography
Chef School
Chelsea
Chelsea Does
The Chelsea Handler Show
Chelsea Lately
Chesapeake Shores
The Chew
Cheyenne
The Chi
The Chica Show
Chicago
Chicago Fire
Chicago Justice
Chicago Med
Chicago P.D.
Chicago Hope
Chicagolicious
The Chicken Squad
Chico and the Man
Chigley (British)
Child Genius (British original)
Child Genius (U.S.)
Child Support
Childrens Hospital
Child's Play
Chilly Beach
Chilling Adventures of Sabrina
The Chimp Channel
China Beach
China, IL
CHiPs
Chip 'n Dale: Rescue Rangers
Chirp (Canada)
Chloe's Closet 
Chōyū Sekai (China/Japan, 2017)
Chocolate News
Chōgattai Majutsu Robo Ginguiser
Choo Choo Soul
Choose Up Sides
Chop Socky Chooks
Chopped
Chopper One
Chorlton and the Wheelies
Chosen
Chowder
Chrisley Knows Best
Chuck's Choice
Chuck
Chuggington (UK)
Church Secrets & Legends
Chuva de Maio

CI

CI5: The New Professionals
Ciao Darwin (Italy)
Ciel mon mardi (France)
Cimarron Strip
The Circle
Circus Boy
Cirque du Soleil: Fire Within (Canada)
The Cisco Kid
Citizen Rose
The City (1995)
The City (1999)
The City (2008)
City Guys
City Lights
Civil Wars

CL

Clangers
Clang Invasion
Clarence (UK) (1988)
Clarence (US) (2014)
Clarissa Explains It All
Clash of the Champions
Class
A Class by Himself
Class of 3000
Class of '74
Class of the Titans
Classical Baby
Cleopatra 2525
The Cleveland Show
Cleo & Cuquin
Cleopatra in Space
Clerks: The Animated Series
Click
The Client List
Clifford the Big Red Dog
Clifford's Puppy Days
Climax!
Cloak & Dagger
Clone High
Close Enough
The Closer
The Clothes Show (UK)
Cloudy with a Chance of Meatballs
Club 57
Club Mario
Clue Club
Clueless
Clutch Cargo

CM
CMT Crossroads

CN
CNN Special Investigations Unit

CO

Coach
Coconut Fred's Fruit Salad Island
CODCO
The Code (British documentary series)
The Code (Australian drama series)
 Cocomelon
The Code (British game show)
The Code (US drama series)
Code Black
Code Geass
Code Lyoko
Code Monkeys
Code Red, American drama series
Code Red, Indian crime series
Codename: Kids Next Door
Co-Ed Fever
The Colbert Report
The Colbys
Colby's Clubhouse
Cold Case
Cold Case Files
Cold Feet
Cold Justice
Cold Justice: Sex Crimes
Cold Pizza
Colditz
The Colgate Comedy Hour
The Collector
College GameDay (basketball)
College GameDay (football)
Colony
The Colony
Colonel Bleep
Color Splash
Columbo
Combat!
Combo Niños (France)
Come Dancing (British)
Come Dine with Me
Come Dine with Me Australia
Comedy Central Roast
A Comedy Roast (UK)
Come Fly with Me (UK)
 The Comic Strip
Commander in Chief
The Comment Section
The Commish
Committed
Common Knowledge
Community
The Completely Mental Misadventures of Ed Grimley
Conan
Concentration
Confession (1957–1959)
The Conners
Connie the Cow
Connor Undercover
Constantine
Constantine: City of Demons
Container Wars
The Contender
Continuum (Canada)
Contraption
Conviction (2004) (UK)
Conviction (2006) (US)
Conviction (2016) (US)
A Cook's Tour
The Cool Kids
Coop and Cami Ask the World
Cops
COPS (animated)
Copter Patrol
Corner Gas
Coronation Street (UK)
Coronet Blue
Cory in the House
Cosby
The Cosby Mysteries
The Cosby Show
Cosmetic Surgery Live
Cosmic Quantum Ray
Cotorreando
Cougar Town
Countdown (UK)
Countdown (Australia)
Count Duckula
Counting On
Countryfile (UK)
The Country Mouse and the City Mouse Adventures
Country Music Jubilee
A Country Practice
Country Style
Countrytime (1960) (Canada)
Countrytime (1970) (Canada)
Couples Therapy
Courage the Cowardly Dog
The Court
Cousins for Life
Cousin Skeeter
The Courtship of Eddie's Father
Cover Story
Cover Up
Covert Affairs
Cow and Chicken
Cowboy Bebop
 The Cowboys

CP

C.P.O. Sharkey

CR

Cracker (UK)
Cracker (US)
Cracking Up
Craft Corner Deathmatch
Craft Wars
Craig of the Creek
Cram
Crashbox (Canada)
Crashing (UK)
Crashing (US)
Crashletes
Crash & Bernstein
Crayon Shin-chan
Crazy Ex-Girlfriend
Crazy Like A Fox
The Crazy Ones
Crazy Talk
Creature Comforts (UK)
Creepschool
The Crew
Crikey! It's the Irwins
Crime & Punishment
Crime Story
Crimewatch (UK)
Criminal Minds
Criminal Minds
Criminal Minds: Beyond Borders
Criminal Minds: Suspect Behavior
Criss Angel Mindfreak
The Critic
Cro
Croc Files
The Crocodile Hunter
The Crocodile Hunter Diaries
Crossbow
Crossfire (Scotland)
Crossfire (US)
  The Crossing
Crossing Jordan
Crossing Swords
The Crown
Crowned
Crusade
Crusade in Europe
Crusader Rabbit
Crusoe
Crystal Tipps and Alistair (British)

CS

CSI
CSI: Crime Scene Investigation
CSI: Cyber
CSI: Miami
CSI: NY

CU

Cubeez
Cults and Extreme Belief
Cupcake & Dino: General Services
Cupcake Wars
Cupid (1998)
Cupid (2009)
Curb Your Enthusiasm
Curfew
Curious George
The Curse of Oak Island
Cutthroat Kitchen

CY

Cyberchase
Cybersix
Cybill
Cyrus vs. Cyrus: Design and Conquer

Previous:  List of television programs: B    Next:  List of television programs: D